The Dar Es Salaam Investment Bank (ISX: BDSI) is one of the largest commercial banks in Iraq. It was established in 1998.

Other Iraqi banks include: Bank of Baghdad (BNKB), Economy Bank for Investment (BEFI) and Commercial Bank of Iraq (CBIQ).

Other major stocks on the Iraq Stock Exchange include Baghdad Soft Drinks Co, Iraqi Tufted Carpets Co, Hader Marble and Altherar Agriculture.

See also

Economy of Iraq
Central Bank of Iraq

References

External links
 Official Website
 IraqiXchange - Iraqi Market Research

Companies based in Baghdad
Banks of Iraq
Banks established in 1998
Iraqi companies established in 1998
Companies listed on the Iraq Stock Exchange